The 2016 Sydney Roosters season is the 109th in the club's history. They competed in the 2016 National Rugby League season. In 2016, Trent Robinson coached the Sydney Roosters. Jake Friend captained the team in 2016 alongside two vice-captains in Boyd Cordner and Jared Waerea-Hargreaves.

Squad

Squad movements

Results

Auckland Nines

Pre-season

Regular season

Ladder

Player statistics

Representative honours

References

External links

 National Rugby League
 Rugby League Project
 Sydney Roosters
 Zero Tackle

Sydney Roosters seasons
Sydney Roosters season